Belmont is a city in San Mateo County in the U.S. state of California. It is in the San Francisco Bay Area, on the San Francisco Peninsula about halfway between San Francisco and San Jose. Known for its wooded hills, views of the San Francisco Bay and stretches of open space, Belmont is a quiet residential community in the midst of the culturally and technologically rich Bay Area. It was originally part of Rancho de las Pulgas, for which one of its main roads, the Alameda de las Pulgas, is named. The city was incorporated in 1926. Its population was 28,335 at the 2020 census.

Ralston Hall is a historic landmark built by Bank of California founder William Chapman Ralston on the campus of Notre Dame de Namur University, and is also home to Notre Dame High School. It was built around a villa formerly owned by Count , an Italian aristocrat. The locally famous "Waterdog Lake" is also located in the foothills and highlands of Belmont. A surviving structure from the Panama–Pacific International Exposition is on Belmont Avenue (another is the Palace of Fine Arts in San Francisco). The building was brought to Belmont by E.D. Swift shortly after the exposition closed in 1915.

The city is bordered by San Mateo to the north, Half Moon Bay to the west, Redwood Shores to the east, and San Carlos to the south.

Belmont has a smoking ordinance, passed in January 2009, which bans smoking in all businesses and multi-story apartments and condominiums; the ordinance has been described as one of the strictest in the nation.

Etymology

The name is believed to derive from the Italian bel monte, meaning "beautiful mountain." The town was  named for the "symmetrically rounded eminence" nearby.

Geography

Belmont is located at  (37.518087, -122.291673).

Demographics

2020
Belmont's population in 2020 was reported as 28,335. The population density was 6,119.9 inhabitants per square mile (2,362.9/km). The racial makeup of the city was 14,248 (50.3%) White, 370 (1.3%) Black or African American, 102 (0.4%) American Indian and Alaska Native, 8,398 (29.6%) Asian, 148 (0.5%) Native Hawaiian and Other Pacific Islander, 1,527 (5.4%) Some Other Race, and 3,542 (12.5%) two or more races. The largest mixed-race groups were White and Some Other Race (1,345, 4.7%) and White and Asian (1,312, 4.6%). 3,523 residents (12.4%) were Hispanic or Latino (of any race). Among the residents who were not Hispanic or Latino, 13,572 were White, 348 were Black or African American, 22 were American Indian and Alaska Native, 8,330 were Asian, 132 were Native Hawaiians or other Pacific Islanders, 300 were of other races, and 2,108 were of two or more races. 2020 was the first recent census in which non-Hispanic White people were not the majority of the population in Belmont (47.9%). Among Hispanic and Latino residents, 676 identified their race as White, 22 Black or African American, 80 American Indian and Alaska Native, 68 Asian, 16 Native Hawaiian and Other Pacific Islander, 1,227 Some Other Race, and 1,434 two or more races. 1,021 Hispanic or Latino residents identified their race as both White and Some Other Race.

There were 11,169 housing units, of which 10,705 were occupied and 464 were vacant.

722 people (2.5%) were living in group quarters, including 203 in nursing facilities, 339 in college/university student housing, and 180 in other facilities.

22,198 people (78.3%) were 18 years old or older, while 6,137 (21.7%) were younger than 18 years old.

2010
At the 2010 census Belmont had a population of 25,835. The racial makeup of Belmont was 17,455 (67.6%) White, 420 (1.6%) African American, 72 (0.3%) Native American, 5,151 (19.9%) Asian, 198 (0.8%) Pacific Islander, 964 (3.7%) from other races, and 1,572 (6.1%) from two or more races. Hispanic or Latino of any race were 2,977 persons (11.5%).

The census reported that 25,321 people (98.0% of the population) lived in households, 394 (1.5%) lived in non-institutionalized group quarters, and 120 (0.5%) were institutionalized.

There were 10,575 households, 3,251 (30.7%) had children under the age of 18 living in them, 5,630 (53.2%) were opposite-sex married couples living together, 830 (7.8%) had a female householder with no husband or wife present, 391 (3.7%) had a male householder with no wife or husband present.  There were 510 (4.8%) unmarried opposite-sex partnerships, and 96 (0.9%) same-sex married couples or partnerships. 2,904 households (27.5%) were one person and 997 (9.4%) had someone living alone who was 65 or older. The average household size was 2.39.  There were 6,851 families (64.8% of households); the average family size was 2.95.

The age distribution was 5,395 people (20.9%) under the age of 18, 1,668 people (6.5%) aged 18 to 24, 7,645 people (29.6%) aged 25 to 44, 7,284 people (28.2%) aged 45 to 64, and 3,843 people (14.9%) who were 65 or older.  The median age was 40.9 years. For every 100 females, there were 95.4 males.  For every 100 females age 18 and over, there were 92.5 males.

There were 11,028 housing units at an average density of 2,381.8 per square mile, of the occupied units 6,280 (59.4%) were owner-occupied and 4,295 (42.0%) were rented. The homeowner vacancy rate was 0.7%; the rental vacancy rate was 5.2%.  16,473 people (63.8% of the population) lived in owner-occupied housing units and 8,848 people (34.2%) lived in rental housing units.

2000
At the 2000 census there were 25,123 people in 10,418 households, including 6,542 families, in the city.
Of the 10,418 households 26.4% had children under the age of 18 living with them, 52.6% were married couples living together, 7.1% had a female householder with no husband present, and 37.2% were non-families. 27.2% of households were one person and 7.3% were one person aged 65 or older.  The average household size was 2.35 and the average family size was 2.89.

The age distribution was 19.3% under the age of 18, 6.5% from 18 to 24, 35.9% from 25 to 44, 25.1% from 45 to 64, and 13.2% 65 or older.  The median age was 39 years. For every 100 females, there were 96.7 males.  For every 100 females age 18 and over, there were 94.6 males.

According to a 2007 estimate, the median income for a household in the city was $99,739, and the median family income  was $122,515. Males had a median income of $63,281 versus $46,957 for females. The per capita income for the city was $42,812.  About 1.7% of families and 4.0% of the population were below the poverty line, including 3.2% of those under age 18 and 4.8% of those age 65 and over.

In May 2009, Belmont was ranked 11th on Forbes list of "America's Top 25 Towns to Live Well."

Government

Federal and state representation

According to the California Secretary of State, as of February 10, 2019, Belmont has 15,827 registered voters. Of those, 7,678 (48.5%) are registered Democrats, 2,540 (16%) are registered Republicans, and 4,994 (31.6%) have declined to state a political party.

Facilities
The city is served by the Belmont Public Library of the San Mateo County Libraries, a member of the Peninsula Library System.

The city has a number of parks.  This includes Twin Pines Park, Waterdog Lake Open Space, Semeria Park and Davey Glen Park.

Child education is provided by public and private facilities. Students in Belmont are eligible to receive public schooling through two school districts: Belmont-Redwood Shores School District (kindergarten through middle school) and Sequoia Union High School District (high school). There are also several private schools. The private Charles Armstrong School specializes in language-based learning differences, such as dyslexia.

The city's largest hotel is Hyatt House, which is an apartment hotel and caters mostly to a business clientele, due to its proximity to Oracle headquarters.

Smoking policy
In January 2009, Belmont adopted an ordinance that bans smoking in city parks, all businesses, and all multi-story apartments and condominiums. The policy, which has been described as perhaps the strictest anti-smoking law in the nation, was the result of a group of retirees lobbying the city to stop secondhand smoke from drifting into their apartments from neighboring places. Public health advocates consider the ordinance to be a new front in a national battle against tobacco; officials from the American Lung Association of California said "Belmont broke through this invisible barrier in the sense that it addressed drifting smoke in housing as a public health issue."

Education

Public schools 
The public schools in Belmont are highly rated. The public schools in Belmont are run by the Belmont – Redwood Shores School District (BRSSD). The public high school in Belmont, Carlmont High School, however, is in Sequoia Union High School District.

Elementary schools 
 Central Elementary School, California Distinguished School
 Cipriani Elementary School, California Distinguished School 
 Fox, National Blue Ribbon School
 Nesbit, California Distinguished School

Middle schools 
 Ralston Middle School, California Distinguished School
 Nesbit (K-8), California Distinguished School

High school 
 Carlmont High School, California Distinguished School

Private schools 
 Immaculate Heart of Mary School (Preschool through 8th Grade)
Notre Dame High School
 Charles Armstrong School specializing in language-based learning differences, such as dyslexia

Colleges 
 Notre Dame de Namur University

Economy

Top employers

According to the city's 2021 Comprehensive Annual Financial Report, the top employers in 2021 were:

Sister cities

 Namur, Belgium
 Belmont, Massachusetts, United States

See also

San Mateo County
Economy of California
San Francisco Bay Area

References

External links

 
 Belmont information resource from the Belmont Chamber of Commerce

1926 establishments in California
Cities in San Mateo County, California
Cities in the San Francisco Bay Area
Incorporated cities and towns in California
Populated places established in 1926